Selvole is a small village in the comune of Radda in Chianti. Radda in Chianti is located within the Province of Siena, in Tuscany, Italy.

Frazioni of Radda in Chianti